The 1992 United States Senate election in North Dakota was held on November 3, 1992, along with other elections to the United States Senate in other states as well as elections to the United States House of Representatives and various state and local elections. Incumbent Democratic-NPL U.S. Senator Kent Conrad retired, having given a pledge that he would not run for re-election if the federal budget deficit was higher than when he was first elected; however, when the other Senate seat became vacant, he ran in the special election and won. Democratic-NPL U.S. Congressman Byron Dorgan won the open seat.

Major candidates

Dem-NPL
 Byron Dorgan, U.S. Representative for North Dakota's at-large congressional district (1980-)

Republican
 Steve Sydness, CEO of Endurance International Group

Results

See also
 1992 United States Senate elections

References

External links
 

North Dakota
1992
1992 North Dakota elections